Manissery is a town in the Palakkad District of Kerala state in India.  It is about 4 km west of Ottapalam.

Cities and towns in Palakkad district